Robert Costin is a British teacher, organist and harpsichordist. He is senior Director of Music at Rugby School Thailand.

Life and career
Robert Costin was a chorister at Peterborough Cathedral, a music scholar at Oundle School and then organ scholar at Pembroke College, Cambridge 1990–93. His teachers included David Sanger and Nicholas Danby. He has held organist posts at the Wellington Cathedral of St Paul, Holy Trinity Cathedral, Auckland, and Blackburn Cathedral. Robert has held teaching posts at Worksop College, Bedford School, Ardingly College, Highgate School, St Paul's Cathedral School, Sherborne School and St Louis School, Milan. He has performed extensively throughout Europe, Australasia and North America.

Discography
Organ Triumphant (Kiwi Pacific Records)
Howells Organ Music (Atoll Records)
Liszt and Reubke Organ Works (Atoll Records)
The Excellent Art of Voluntary (Atoll Records)
Bach Goldberg Variations(Stone Records)
Bach Trio Sonatas (Stone Records)
Bach Well-Tempered Clavier (Stone Records)

References

External links 
 Official website
 Artist page on Stone Records website
 Robert Costin (Organ) at Bach-Cantata.com

Living people
Alumni of Pembroke College, Cambridge
English classical organists
British male organists
Alumni of the Royal Academy of Music
21st-century organists
21st-century British male musicians
Year of birth missing (living people)
Male classical organists